The Yurkharovskoye gas field is a natural gas field located in the Yamalo-Nenets Autonomous Okrug. It was discovered in 1970 and developed by Novatek. It began production in 2003 and produces natural gas and condensates. The total proven reserves of the Yurkharovskoye gas field are around 15.431 trillion cubic feet (437×109 m³), and production is slated to be around 3.3 billion cubic feet/day (93×106 m³) in 2010.

As of 2013 Novatek and its partners TotalEnergies and the China National Petroleum Corporation are building a liquefied natural gas plant with 3 LNG trains, Yamal LNG, which expected to produce its first LNG in early 2017. Continued shrinkage of Arctic sea ice is anticipated to enable use of the Northern Sea Route to ship LNG to China. Export of gas is contingent on modification of the gas export monopoly held by Gazprom.

References

Natural gas fields in Russia
Natural gas fields in the Soviet Union